Belonophora coffeoides is a species of flowering plant in the family Rubiaceae. It is found in Tropical Africa. It is the type species of the genus Belonophora.

Subspecies
Two subspecies are widely accepted as of April 2014:

Belonophora coffeoides subsp. coffeoides - São Tomé (not seen since 1861, possibly extinct)
Belonophora coffeoides subsp. hypoglauca (Welw. ex Hiern) S.E.Dawson & Cheek - Benin, Ghana, Guinée, Cote d'Ivoire, Liberia, Nigeria, Sierra Leone, Togo, Central African Republic, Cameroon, Gabon, Congo-Brazzaville, Congo-Kinshasa, Chad, Sudan, South Sudan, Uganda, Angola, Zambia

References

External links
World Checklist of Rubiaceae

coffeoides
Flora of West Tropical Africa
Flora of West-Central Tropical Africa
Flora of São Tomé Island
Flora of Angola
Flora of Cameroon
Flora of Chad
Flora of Gabon
Flora of Liberia
Flora of Sudan
Flora of Togo
Flora of Uganda
Flora of Zambia
Taxa named by Joseph Dalton Hooker